Rave Mobile Safety (formerly Rave Wireless) is an American software company founded in New York City in 2004, and currently based in Framingham, Massachusetts. The company provides a suite of software applications for safety. Early investors included Bain Capital Ventures, Sigma Partners, and RRE Ventures.  More recently, Technology Crossover Ventures took a lead investment position 

The company claims a total of 8,000 contracted clients representing 1,800 higher education institutions, 10,000 K-12 schools, 3,00 public safety agencies and 9-1-1 centers in all 50 U.S. states as customers, with over 50 million individuals protected.5

History
Initially the company was focused primarily on higher education institutes and offered customized mobile phone services and associated services.  Their first customer was Montclair State University in NJ, which won the Jeanne Clery Campus Safety award for their implementation of the Rave Guardian product. The company moved into solely focusing on safety applications and now has a broader portfolio of applications used by Emergency Management Agencies, corporate safety offices, law enforcement, and schools.

In 2015, the company announced a new product, Rave Panic Button, which was launched in Everett (WA) Schools, in Snohomish County, Washington. Schools across both Nassau and Suffolk Counties in NY have used it.

In 2017, the company expanded into Canada, acquiring ERMS, a Canadian emergency notification provider.

References

External links
https://www.nbcnews.com/nightly-news/video/family-pushes-for-smart911-upgrades-after-tragedy-1282656835635

Companies based in Framingham, Massachusetts
Software companies of the United States